There have been twelve ships of the Royal Navy that have been named HMS Flying Fish, after the Flying Fish.

 was a cutter purchased in 1778 and wrecked off Calais in 1782. The French appear to have refloated her and taken her into service as Poisson Volant, commissioning her at Dunkirk on 12 June 1783. In 1785 or 1786 she was struck off at Brest.
 was previously the schooner Poisson Volant captured from the French in 1803. Renamed Firefly in 1807, she foundered in the West Indies that same year with the loss of all hands.
 was a schooner launched in 1804 and captured by prisoners on board. She became the French 5-gun privateer Tropard, which  recaptured in 1808. She did not return to service with the Royal Navy.   
 was the schooner Revenge, purchased in 1806 and wrecked in 1808.
 was previously the brig-sloop Flyvendefiske captured from the Danes in 1807 and sold in 1811.
 was previously Lady Augusta, purchased in 1817 and sold in 1821.
 was a brig launched in 1844 and broken up in 1852.
 was a despatch vessel launched in 1855 and broken up in 1866.
 was laid down as the  sloop HMS Daring, renamed prior to being launched in 1873. Converted to a survey ship in 1880 and sold in 1888.
 was a  launched in 1897 and broken up in 1919.
 was a  launched in 1944, given to Royal Ceylon Navy as HMCyS Vijaya, and broken up in 1975.

Also
His Majesty's hired armed schooner  served the Royal Navy from 19 June 1804 to 15 December when  accidentally ran her down and sank her. On 5 September the Navy had renamed her Gertrude, but the change of name was not widely known.

Citations

References
Demerliac, Alain (1996) La Marine De Louis XVI: Nomenclature Des Navires Français De 1774 À 1792. (Nice: Éditions OMEGA).
 

Royal Navy ship names